Manner may refer to:

Concepts
 Manner (philosophy), a philosophical concept
 Manner of (art), a term for art like that of, but not by, a famous artist
 Manner of articulation, a concept in linguistics
 Mannerism, also known as Late Renaissance, is a style in European art 
 Manners, conduct in terms of etiquette

Specifics
 Manner (company), a Macau entertainment company
 Manner (confectionery), a brand of confectionery from the Austrian conglomerate, Josef Manner & Comp AG
 Manner (surname)
 Manner, an album by the Finnish pop-rock band Scandinavian Music Group

See also 
 Männer (disambiguation)
 Mannerheim (disambiguation)
 Manners (disambiguation)
 Manor (disambiguation)